William Spell is an American entrepreneur based in Minneapolis. He is the Founder and current President of Spell Capital Partners. The company is based in Minneapolis, Minnesota and manages private equity and mezzanine capital.

Spell started out his career as an investment banker, working for a Midwest-based regional investment bank. The majority of Spell's career has been spent in private equity buyouts, mergers and acquisitions. He is also well known for capital raising and business management expertise.

Spell is the founder of Spell Estate Winery in Sonoma, California and has been part of numerous charitable foundations including the Spell Family Foundation, which was founded by Spell and his wife, Tiki.

Early life

Spell was born and grew up in Golden Valley, Minnesota. His parents were first generation Americans, after his grandparents had emigrated from Greece.

Spell attended Golden Valley High School and graduated in 1975. He later went on to obtain a Bachelor of Science degree from the University of Minnesota in 1979. While at the University of Minnesota, he was a member of the Sigma Alpha Epsilon fraternity. Spell also earned a Master of Business Administration (MBA) from the Carlson School of Management at the University of Minnesota in 1981. From 2006 - 2007, he served as an adjunct instructor at the University of Minnesota Carlson School, teaching a course on Leadership in Business Management.

Career

Spell began his career working for a regional investment-banking firm. He served as the VP and Director of Corporate Finance from 1981 to 1988. 
 
In 1988, Spell left the company and founded Spell Capital Partners. The company was created as a small-cap private equity buyout firm specializing in industrial manufacturing investments.

From 1993 to 2006, Spell served as the CEO of the publicly traded company, PW Eagle. Spell Capital held a controlling interest in the company. PW Eagle was the second largest plastic pipe maker in the United States at the time. In 2006, the company had approximately $720 million in sales with over $100 million EBITDA cash flow. During that year, Spell exited the investment.

Since 1997, Spell has been a member of the Young President's Organization and the World President's Organization. In the same year, he was part of the "40 Under 40" selection by the Twin Cities Business Journal.

In 2010, Twin Cities Business Magazine named Spell one of "200 Minnesotans you should know."

Spell is the president of Spell Capital Partners. The firm specializes in manufacturing businesses, and has a focus in the plastics industry, machinery and equipment, and various metal fabrication sectors.

Spell Capital Partners, where Spell is president, is one of the oldest private equity firms in the country, and is an established leader in the small-cap private equity market.

Philanthropy

In 1997, Spell and his wife Tiki established the Spell Family Foundation. The foundation supports mainly religious, medical, and children's philanthropies.

Spell has also served on the board of directors for a number of philanthropic organizations including the Minneapolis Heart Institute at Abbott Northwestern Hospital, the Minnesota Zoo, the Center for the American Experiment, and the 1% Giving Club.

He is a member of the Greek Orthodox Church, and has served as President of his local parish. He is involved with several organizations affiliated with the Greek Orthodox Archdiocese of North and South America.

Spell Estate

Bill and his wife Tiki founded Spell Estate in 2006, and produced their first wine vintage that next year. Spell Estate is located just outside Santa Rosa, California, and produces Pinot Noir, Chardonnay, and Rosé from grapes sourced in Sonoma County, Mendocino, and the Yorkville Highlands regions of Northern California. current reviews

The wines produced have received excellent reviews from a number of wine authorities including Wine Spectator, the Pinot File, Wine & Spirits, Wine Enthusiast, the Tasting Panel and Stephen Tanzer's International Wine Cellar (now Vinous). Their 2015 vintage production was around 1,400 cases, including single-vineyard wines from Terra de Promissio, Weir, Alder Springs and Umino Vineyards. website

Personal life

Spell currently resides in Edina, Minnesota and Scottsdale, Arizona with his wife, Tiki Spell and has two adult children.

References

Investment in the United States
American people of Greek descent
Year of birth missing (living people)
Living people